Ubiquitin carboxyl-terminal hydrolase isozyme L5 is an enzyme that in humans is encoded by the UCHL5 gene.

References

Further reading